John Salesbury (1533–1580), of Rûg, near Corwen, Merionethshire and Bachymbyd, near Ruthin, Denbighshire, was a Welsh politician.

He was a Member (MP) of the Parliament of England for Denbigh Boroughs in April 1554 and 1558, for Denbighshire in 1559 and Merioneth in October 1553.

References

1533 births
1580 deaths
People from Merionethshire
16th-century Welsh politicians
Members of the Parliament of England for Denbighshire
Members of the Parliament of England (pre-1707) for constituencies in Wales
English MPs 1553 (Mary I)
English MPs 1554
English MPs 1558
English MPs 1559